WKE (Woonwagenkamp Emmen) is a football club from Emmen, Netherlands. WKE was founded on June 14, 1966 by residents of the local trailer park. The club won promotion to the Hoofdklasse in 1981. Since 1981, WKE have been relegated to the Eerste Klasse in 1998 and 2004. WKE won the Sunday Hoofdklasse C title in the 2006–07 season and was nationwide amateur champion in 2008–09.

Many of their players have played for FC Emmen in their youth or are retired former professional football players.

Current squad 
As of 1 February 2014

External links
 Official website 

 
Association football clubs established in 1966
1966 establishments in the Netherlands
Football clubs in the Netherlands
Football clubs in Emmen, Netherlands